Christopher Lucas Feigenbaum (born 4 November 1989) is a Puerto Rican international soccer player who played college soccer for University of Central Florida, as a midfielder.

External links

1989 births
Living people
Puerto Rican footballers
Puerto Rico international footballers
UCF Knights men's soccer players
Sportspeople from Monterey, California
Soccer players from California
Association football midfielders